Charles Woollett (25 November 1920 – 16 July 2011) was an English professional footballer who played as a left winger.

Career
Born in Murton, Woollett played for Eppleton Colliery Welfare, Newcastle United, Bradford City, Murton Colliery Welfare, York City and Blyth Spartans.

While at Newcastle he was a guest for Middlesbrough and Hartlepools United during World War II.

He joined Bradford City in August 1946, leaving the club in February 1949. For Bradford he made 43 appearances in the Football League, and one in the FA Cup.

Sources

References

1920 births
2011 deaths
People from Murton, County Durham
Footballers from County Durham
English footballers
Newcastle United F.C. players
Middlesbrough F.C. wartime guest players
Hartlepool United F.C. wartime guest players
Bradford City A.F.C. players
Murton A.F.C. players
York City F.C. players
Blyth Spartans A.F.C. players
English Football League players
Association football wingers